The 13th Pan American Games were held in Havana, Cuba from August 2 to August 18, 1991.

Medals

Gold

Men's Recurve: Darrell Pace
Men's Recurve (30 m): Edwin Eliason
Men's Recurve (50 m): Eric Brumlow
Men's Recurve (70 m): Darrell Pace
Men's Recurve (90 m): Eric Brumlow
Men's Recurve Team: United States
Women's Recurve: Denise Parker
Women's Recurve (30 m): Denise Parker
Women's Recurve (50 m): Janet Dykman
Women's Recurve (60 m): Denise Parker
Women's Recurve (70 m): Denise Parker
Women's Recurve Team: United States

Men's 800 metres: Ocky Clark
Men's 110 metres hurdles: Cletus Clark
Men's Pole vault: Pat Manson
Men's Discus throw: Anthony Washington
Men's Hammer throw: Jim Driscoll
Women's 1500 metres: Alisa Hill
Women's 3000 metres: Sabrina Dornhoefer
Women's Heptathlon: DeDee Nathan
Women's 4 × 400 m relay: Natasha Kaiser-Brown, Tasha Downing, Maicel Malone, and Jearl Miles-Clark

Men's Light Welterweight (– 63.5 kilograms): Stevie Johnston

Men's Masters: Patrick Healey
Men's Teams: Steve Kloempken, Ralph Solan, Jon Juneau, and Patrick Healey
Women's Teams: Maureen Webb, Julie Gardner, Mandy Wilson, and Lynda Norry

Women's 3.000m Individual Pursuit (Track): Kendra Kneeland
Women's Individual Race (Road): Jeanne Golay
Women's Team Time Trial (Road): United States

Men's 1m Springboard: Mark Lenzi 
Men's 3m Springboard: Kent Ferguson 
Women's 1m Springboard: Jill Schlabach 
Women's 3m Springboard: Karen LaFace 
Women's 10m Platform: Eileen Richetelli

Men's Team Competition: United States men's national soccer team

Men's Light Middleweight (– 78 kilograms): Jason Morris
Men's Middleweight (– 86 kilograms): Joseph Wanang
Women's Lightweight (– 56 kilograms): Kate Donahue

Men's Lightning: Matt Fisher, Steven Callison and Sean Fidler 
Men's Board: Ted Huang 
Women's 470: Amy Lawser and Susan Lawser 
Women's Board: Lanee Butler

Silver

Men's Recurve: Edwin Eliason
Men's Recurve (30 m): Jay Barrs
Men's Recurve (70 m): Eric Brumlow
Men's Recurve (90 m): Jay Barrs
Women's Recurve: Jennifer O'Donnell
Women's Recurve (30 m): Kitty Frazier
Women's Recurve (50 m): Denise Parker
Women's Recurve (60 m): Jennifer O'Donnell
Women's Recurve (70 m): Kitty Frazier

Men's 100 metres: Andre Cason
Men's 200 metres: Kevin Little
Men's 800 metres: Terril Davis
Men's 1500 metres: Bill Burke
Men's 400 m hurdles: McClinton Neal
Men's Long jump: Llewellyn Starks
Men's Hammer throw: Jud Logan
Men's Javelin throw: Mike Barnett
Men's 4 × 400 m relay: Clarence Daniel, Quincy Watts, Jeff Reynolds, and Gabriel Luke
Women's 100 metres: Chryste Gaines
Women's 800 metres: Alisa Hill
Women's Shot put: Connie Price-Smith
Women's Javelin throw: Donna Mayhew
Women's Heptathlon: Sharon Hanson
Women's 10,000 m race walk: Debbi Lawrence

Men's Featherweight (– 57 kilograms): Kenneth Friday
Men's Lightweight (– 60 kilograms): Patrice Brooks
Men's Heavyweight (– 91 kilograms): Shannon Briggs

Women's Masters: Julie Gardner

Men's 1.000m Time Trial (Track): Erin Hartwell
Men's 4.000m Individual Pursuit (Track): Dirk Copeland
Men's 4.000m Team Pursuit (Track): United States
Women's 1.000m Sprint (Track): Julie Gregg

Men's 3m Springboard: Mark Bradshaw
Women's 1m Springboard: Alison Malsch 
Women's 10m Platform: Alison Malsch

Women's Clubs: Naomi Hewitt-Couturier

Men's Flyweight (– 56 kilograms): Clifton Sunada
Men's Light Heavyweight (– 95 kilograms): Leo White
Men's Open: Christophe Leininger
Women's Flyweight (– 45 kilograms): Cathy Lee
Women's Extra Lightweight (– 48 kilograms): Valerie Lafon
Women's Half Middleweight (– 61 kilograms): Lynn Roethke

Men's Laser: Sam Kerner

Men's Team Competition: United States men's national water polo team

Bronze

Men's 100 metres: Jeff Williams
Men's 400 metres: Jeff Reynolds
Men's 110 m hurdles: Elbert Ellis
Men's 400 m hurdles: Torrance Zellner
Men's High jump: Hollis Conway
Men’s Triple jump: Jason Allegri
Men's Shot put: C.J. Hunter
Men's Decathlon: Sheldon Blockburger
Women's 400 metres: Jearl Miles
Women's 100 m hurdles: Arnita Myricks
Women's 400 m hurdles: Tonja Buford-Bailey
Women's High jump: Jan Wohlschlag
Women's Long jump: Julie Bright
Women's Shot put: Ramona Pagel
Women's Discus throw: Lacy Barnes
Women's 4 × 100 m relay: Chryste Gaines, Inger Miller, Donna Howard, and Arnita Myricks

Men's Team Competition: United States men's national basketball team
Women's Team Competition: United States women's national basketball team

Men's Light Middleweight (– 71 kilograms): Ravea Springs
Men's Middleweight (– 75 kilograms): Michael DeMoss

Men's Masters: Jon Juneau
Women's Masters: Mandy Wilson

Men's Team Time Trial (Road): United States
Women's 1.000m Sprint (Track): Jessica Grieco
Women's Individual Race (Road): Janice Bolland

Men's 10m Platform: Patrick Jeffrey

Women's Rope: Naomi Hewitt-Couturier 
Women's Ball: Jennifer Lovell 
Women's Team: United States

Men's Team Competition: United States men's national handball team

Men's Bantamweight (– 60 kilograms): Edward Liddie
Men's Featherweight (– 65 kilograms): Jimmy Pedro
Men's Lightweight (– 71 kilograms): Dan Hatano
Men's Heavyweight (+ 95 kilograms): James Bacon
Women's Middleweight (– 66 kilograms): Liliko Owasawara
Women's Half Heavyweight (– 72 kilograms): Tammy Hensley

Men's 470: Morgan Larson and Paul Kerner 
Women's Laser: Karen Long 
Mixed Snipe: Peter Commette and Tarasa Davis

Results by event

Basketball

Men's team competition
Preliminary round (group A)
Defeated Cuba (92-88)
Defeated Venezuela (91-66)
Defeated Argentina (87-81)
Defeated Bahamas (116-58)
Quarterfinals
Defeated Uruguay (114-68)
Semifinals
Lost to Puerto Rico (68-73)
Bronze Medal Match
Defeated Cuba (93-74) → Bronze Medal
Team roster
Anthony Bennett
Terry Dehere
Grant Hill
Thomas Hill
James Jackson
Adam Keefe
Christian Laettner
Eric Montross
Tracy Murray
Mike Peplowski
Clarence Weatherspoon
Walt Williams
Head coach: Gene Keady (Purdue University)

Women's Team Competition
Preliminary Round Robin
Defeated Canada (93-47)
Lost to Brazil (84-87) 
Defeated Argentina (97-40)
Defeated Cuba (91-71)
Semifinals
Lost to Cuba (81-86)
Bronze Medal Match
Defeated Canada (92-61) → Bronze Medal
Team roster
Jennifer Azzi
Medina Dixon  
Michelle Edwards 
Teresa Edwards 
Bridgette Gordon 
Sonja Henning  
Venus Lacy 
Andrea Lloyd   
Katrina McClain 
Andrea Stinson  
Regina Street
Lynette Woodard 
Head coach: C. Vivian Stringer (University of Iowa)

Volleyball

Men's team competition
Preliminary round
Defeated Canada (3-1)
Lost to Brazil (0-3)
Defeated Puerto Rico (3-1)
Lost to Cuba (0-3)
Defeated Argentina (3-2)
Semifinals
Lost to Brazil (0-3)
Bronze Medal Match
Lost to Argentina (1-3) → Fourth place
Team roster

See also
 United States at the 1992 Summer Olympics

Nations at the 1991 Pan American Games
P
1991